Rory Jordan (born 9 February 2000) is an Australian professional footballer who plays as a forward for APIA Leichhardt on loan from Newcastle Jets.

Club career

Newcastle Jets
In June 2022, Jordan signed a two-year contract with A-League Men club Newcastle Jets.

Loan to APIA Leichhardt
In January 2023, Jordan was loaned to NPL NSW club APIA Leichhardt to provide him with game time.

References

External links

Living people
2000 births
Australian soccer players
Association football forwards
National Premier Leagues players
A-League Men players
Marconi Stallions FC players
Western Sydney Wanderers FC players
Macarthur FC players
Newcastle Jets FC players
 APIA Leichhardt FC players